Over 100 Metrobus routes are operated by Miami-Dade Transit with some routes contracted by LSF, serving Miami-Dade County, Florida and connecting with several routes in adjacent counties. Most routes are identified by number or letter, however several others, specifically Express, MAX, Shuttle, and Flyer routes have formal names as well. Routes that are labeled as "Connections" are regular service routes introduced during the 2000s that for the most part are either primarily or were formerly operated by minibuses. Routes labeled as MAX, short for Metro Area Express', are limited stop services. Some routes have branches that carry an "A" or "B" suffix while the "X" suffix denotes an express route, although for the 95X this exists only in print. The West Kendall area buses do not use "X" either and instead are labeled as KAT, standing for Kendall Area Transit, which only includes Route 204 and Route 272.

Lettered Metrobus routes primarily serve Miami Beach, a practice inherited from the Miami Beach Railway Company upon its public takeover in 1962. Increasingly these routes are being referred to by a 100-series number corresponding to that letter's position in the alphabet (101-126 except for 104 which is a suburban Kendall route which also serves MDC Kendall Campus), however these numbers only appear online, customer service applications, and the GO Miami Dade App and do not appear on printed timetables or on the buses themselves. They will also be shown in parentheses next to the letter. When the former route T was converted into a MAX line in November 2008, it was re-designated as route 120. There was a similar occurrence when MDT took over the South Beach ElectroWave shuttle service in October 2005. It was merged with the similar pre-existing route W, rebranded as the South Beach Local, and given a number of 123. However, this number does not appear on the buses or on timetables. In December 2009, MDT merged route R and a portion of route K to two new routes numbered 115 & 117, doing away with the R and K lettered designations.

Routes
Route information effective as of March 2023.

1 (SW 173rd St. Busway station <-> South Miami Heights/Quail Roost Drive-SW 114th Avenue)
2 (The Mall at 163rd Street <-> Downtown Bus Terminal via NW 2 Avenue & N.Miami Avenue select trips serves Horace Mann Middle School)  (Weekdays Only) 
2A (NE 84th St./2nd Ave. <-> Downtown Bus Terminal via NW 2nd Ave.)
3 (Aventura Mall <-> Downtown Bus Terminal via Biscayne Blvd and 163rd Street Mall.) (24 Hours)
7 (Downtown Miami <-> Dolphin Mall via NW 7th St)
7A (Downtown Miami <-> Miami International Airport Central Station via NW 7 St)
8 (FIU Maidique Campus bus terminal or SW 8th Street/57th Avenue (Weekday Peak Hours Only) <-> Brickell Station via SW 8th Street and Westchester) (Weekdays Only)
8A (FIU Maidique Campus bus terminal <-> Brickell Station via SW 8th St.) (Weekdays Only)
8B (Westchester <-> Brickell Station via SW 8th St.) (Weekends Only)
9 (Aventura Mall or The Mall at 163rd Street <-> Downtown Bus Terminal via NE 2nd Ave.)
10 (Skylake Mall <-> Omni Terminal  via NE 2nd Ave. also serves The Mall at 163rd Street)
11 (FIU Maidique Campus bus terminal <-> Downtown Bus Terminal/Government Center Station via Flagler St) (24 Hours)
11A (Mall of the Americas <-> Downtown Bus Terminal/Government Center Station via Flagler St.) (24 Hours)
12 (Northside Station <-> Mercy Hospital via NW/SW 12th Avenue)
16 (The Mall at 163rd Street <-> Omni Terminal via NE 6th/16 Avenues) 
17 (Norwood-NW 183rd St/7th Ave <-> Vizcaya Metrorail Station via NW/SW 17th  Avenue)
17A (NW 103rd St/7th Ave <-> Flagler St & 17 Avenue via NW 17 Avenue)  (Weekdays Peak-Hours Only) 
19 (MDC North Campus <-> Mall at 163rd Street via NW/NE 119th St.) (Weekdays Only)
21 (Northside Station <-> Downtown Bus Terminal via NW 12 Avenue) 
22 (The Mall at 163rd Street <-> Coconut Grove Station via NW/SW 22nd Ave.)
22A (The Mall at 163 Street <-> Flagler Street/SW 22 Avenue via NW 22nd Ave)
24 (Brickell Metrorail Station <-> SW 137th Avenue/Coral Way).  (Coral Way Limited)
24A (Brickell Metrorail Station <-> West Dade Library/Coral Way & SW 93rd Avenue). (Coral Way Limited)
24B (Brickell Metrorail Station <-> SW 152 Avenue/Coral Way (Weekdays Peak-Hours Only).  (Coral Way Limited) 
27 (Calder Race Track/NW 207th St. <-> Coconut Grove Station via NW/SW 27th Ave.)
27A (NW 211th St/37th Avenue <-> Coconut Grove Station via NW/SW 27th Ave.) (24 Hours)
29 (Miami Lakes Educational Center <-> Hialeah- Palm Avenue/W 3rd St) (Weekdays Only)
31 Busway Local (Dadeland South Station <-> Southland Mall)
32 (Landmark Learning Center <-> Omni Terminal via NW 32 Ave.)
33 (Medley - Lehigh Industrial Park (Weekday Peak-Hours Only) or Hialeah Gardens City Hall <-> Biscayne Plaza via NW 103rd St)
34 Express (Dadeland South Station <-> SW 344 Street & Busway P&R, express) (Weekdays Peak-Hours Only) Trips are now offered from Florida City SW 344 Street Park-n-ride lot to Dadeland South Metrorail Station via the Florida Turnpike in the afternoon and vice versa in the morning. (was 34A until June 17, 2018)
35 (MDC Kendall Campus <-> SW 344th Street & Busway P&R Lot via Homestead Hospital and select weekday trips serves Homestead High School)
35A (MDC Kendall Campus <-> SW 344th Street & Busway P&R Lot)
36 (Miami Springs/Hook Square <-> Biscayne Boulevard via NW/NE 36th St.)
36A (Doral Center <-> Biscayne Boulevard via NW/NE 36th St.)
36B (Dolphin Mall <-> Biscayne Boulevard via NW/NE 36th St.) (Weekdays Only)
37 (Hialeah-W 74th Place/3rd Court <-> South Miami Station via NW/SW 37th Ave., Palm Ave)
38 Busway MAX (Dadeland South Station <-> Florida City via Busway to SW 344 St Park-N-Ride Lot) (24 Hours)
39 Express (Dadeland South Station <-> South-Dade Government Center, express)  (Weekdays Peak-Hours Only) Reverse trips are offered to Dadeland South Metrorail Station via the Florida Turnpike in the afternoon and vice versa in the morning. (was 34B until June 17, 2018)
40 (University Lakes-SW 8th St./129th Pl. <-> Douglas Road Station via SW 40th Street Bird Road) (Weekdays Only)
40B (SW 152nd Avenue <-> Douglas Rd. Station via SW 40th Street)
42 (Opa-Locka Tri-Rail Station <-> Douglas Road Station via NW/SW 42nd Avenue)
43 (Marlins Ballpark <-> Miami Intermodal Center) (Game Days Only)
46 Liberty City Connection (NW 7 Avenue Transit Village <-> Brownsville Metrorail Station.) (Weekday Peak-Hours Only)
51 Flagler MAX (SW 132 Ave./8 St <-> Downtown Bus Terminal/Government Center Station via Flagler Street, limited stops) (Weekdays Only)
52 (Dadeland South Station <-> Goulds/South Dade Health Center)
54 (Hialeah Gardens/NW 87th Avenue-114th Street <-> Biscayne Blvd via NW 54 Street)
54A (Palm Springs North/NW 87th Avenue-186th Street (Weekdays Only) <-> Biscayne Boulevard via NW 54th Street)
55 (Marlins Ballpark Shuttle <-> Culmer Metrorail Station) (Game Days Only)
56 (SW 162 Avenue <-> Nicklaus Children's Hospital via SW 56th St.) (Weekdays Only)
57 (Miami Intermodal Center <-> Jackson South Hospital/SW 152 Street via NW/SW 57th Ave.) (Weekdays Only)
62 (Hialeah/Palm Avenue-West 3rd St <-> Biscayne Boulevard via NW/NE 62 St.)
71 (Dolphin Mall <-> MDC Kendall Campus via SW/NW 107th/112 Avenues)
72 (Miller Square <-> South Miami Station via SW 72nd St.) (Weekdays Only)
72A (West Kendall Terminal <-> South Miami Station via SW 72nd St.) (Weekdays Only)
72A Local (West Kendall Terminal <-> South Miami Station via SW 72nd St. & SW 56 St & 137 Ave) (Weekends Only)
73 (Miami Lakes/Miami Gardens Drive & NW 68th Ave <-> Dadeland South Station via 67th/72nd Avenues.)
75 (Miami Lakes Educational Center <-> FIU Biscayne Bay Campus via NW 175th/183rd Streets.) (Weekdays/Saturday Daytime Only)
75A (Miami Lakes Educational Center <-> 163rd Street Mall via NW 175th/183rd Streets) (Saturday Evenings/Sunday Only)
77 (NW 183rd or 199th Sts. <-> Downtown Bus Terminal/Government Center Station via NW 7th Ave.)
79 79th Street MAX (Northside Station <-> Collins Ave./72 Street via NW/NE 79th Street, limited stops.)
82 Westchester Circulator (FIU Maidique Campus Bus Terminal) <-> SW 8th St/ 71st Ave) (Weekdays/Saturday Only)
87 (Palmetto Station or (Doral Center Weekends Only) <-> Dadeland North Station via NW/SW 87th Ave.)
88 (West Kendall Terminal <-> Dadeland North Station via SW 88th St.)
93 Biscayne MAX (Aventura Mall <-> Downtown Bus Terminal via Biscayne Boulevard, limited stops.) (Weekdays Only)
95 Golden Glades Express (Golden Glades <-> Airport/Doral via I-95 & NW 36th St) (Weekday Peak-Hours Only)
95 Golden Glades Express  (Aventura Mall/Golden Glades <-> Civic Center via I-95) (Weekday Peak-Hours Only)
95 Golden Glades Express (Golden Glades <-> Civic Center via I-95) (Weekday Peak-Hours Only)
95 Golden Glades Express (Golden Glades <-> Downtown Miami via I-95) (Weekday Peak-Hours Only)
95 Golden Glades Express (Miami Gardens/Carol City/Golden Glades <-> Downtown Miami via I-95) (Weekday Peak-Hours Only)
95X Dade/Broward Express  (Broward Blvd Ft. Lauderdale Tri-Rail Station P&R <-> Downtown Bus Terminal via I-95)  ( Weekdays Peak-Hours Only )
95X Dade/Broward Express  (Sheridan Street Tri-Rail Station P&R <-> Downtown Bus Terminal via I-95)  ( Weekdays Peak-Hours Only )
95X Dade/Broward Express  (Broward Blvd Ft. Lauderdale Tri-Rail Station P&R. or Sheridan Street Tri-Rail Station P&R <-> Civic Center Miami via I-95 (Weekdays Peak-Hours Only )
99 (Miami Lakes/Miami Gardens Drive (NW 186th Street) & NW 73rd Ave. or Landmark Learning Center (Weekdays Only) <-> Aventura Mall via NW 199th/215th Streets and Ives Dairy Road.
A (101) (Omni Terminal <->20th Street & Bay Road via Venetian Causeway)
B (102) (Brickell Metrorail Station <-> Key Biscayne via Crandon Blvd or Harbor Drive on the Rickenbacker Causeway.)
C (103) (South Pointe Drive <-> Mount Sinai Hospital via Washington Avenue)
104 (West Kendall Terminal <-> MDC Kendall Campus <-> Dadeland North Station via SW 104 St & SW 88th St.)
E (105) (Golden Glades P&R <-> Hallandale Beach Blvd via NE 163 St & Sunny Isles Causeway)
G (107) (MDC North Campus <-> Harding Ave & 94th Street via NW/NE 125 Street)
H (108) (163rd Street Mall <-> Haulover Park via NE 163 Street/Sunny Isles Causeway)
J (110) (Miami International Airport Central Station <-> Collins Ave/44th Street via NW/NE 36 Street and Julia Tuttle Causeway)
L (112) (Hialeah Station or Northside Station or Amtrak Station <-> Lincoln Rd. via NW/NE 79th Street)  (24 Hours)
M (113) (Mount Sinai Hospital <-> NW 19th Ave./20th Street Civic Center)
115 Mid-North Beach Connection  (Lincoln Rd Mall <-> 88th St.) 
S (119) (Aventura Mall <-> Downtown Bus Terminal via Collins Avenue) - (24 Hours)
120 Beach MAX (Aventura Mall or Haulover Marina <-> Downtown Bus Terminal via Collins/Washington Avenues, limited stops.)  (Was route T (120) before conversion to MAX June 15, 2008)
132 Doral/Tri-Rail Shuttle (Doral Center <-> Hialeah Market Station via NW 36 St.) (Weekday Peak-Hours Only)
135 Hialeah Station <-> FIU Biscayne Bay Campus via NW-NE 135th Street
135A (Miami Lakes/Miami Lakes Drive/NW 60th Avenue (Weekdays Only) <-> FIU Biscayne Bay Campus via NW-NE 135 Street 
136 (The Falls <-> Douglas Road Station via SW 136th Street and Old Cutler Road.) (Weekday Peak-Hours Direction only)
137 West Dade Connection (Dolphin Mall <-> Southland Mall via SW 137th Ave.)
150 Miami Beach Airport Express (South Beach/South Pointe Dr. <-> Miami International Airport Central Station via Collins Avenue, 41st Street/Julia Tuttle Causeway.)
155 Biscayne Gardens Circulator (Golden Glades P&R <-> NW 155 Ln./NW 10th Ave)(Weekdays Only)
175 NW Miami-Dade Express (I-75 & NW 186 St. Park & Ride Lot <-> Palmetto Station via I-75 and SR 826)
183 183rd Local (NW 186 St.-73rd Ave. <-> Aventura Mall via Miami Gardens Drive)
200 Cutler Bay Local  (Cutler Bay Town Hall -  Southland Mall - Caribbean Blvd - South Dade Government Center)
202 Little Haiti Connection (Larchmont Gardens/NW 85th Street-5th Ave. <-> NE 36 St./North Miami Avenue or (Weekdays Mid-Day Only) Biscayne Blvd/NE 79th St)
204 Killian KAT (West Kendall Terminal <-> Hammocks Town Center <-> Dadeland North Station via SW 104 Street, express.) (Weekday Peak-Hours Only)
207 Little Havana Connection (Full clockwise loop from Brickell Station & Government Center Station via SW 7th Street, Beacom Boulevard, and SW 1st Street.)
208 Little Havana Connection (Full counterclockwise loop from Government Center Station & Brickell Station via Flagler Street, Beacom Boulevard, and SW 8th Street.).                                                                                                                            210 Skylake Circulator ( Skylake Mall Via NE 191 St & 19 Ave <-> The Mall At 163rd Street)
211 Overtown Circulator (NW 11th St/11th Ave. <-> Williams Park via NW 3 Ave.) (Weekdays Middays Only).                                                                           
212 Sweetwater Circulator (Flagler St./SW 107th Ave. <-> NW 2 St./114th Ave.) (Weekday Middays Only)
238 East-West Connection (Miami International Airport Central Station  <-> Dolphin Mall via NW 25th Street.) (Weekdays Only)
241 Tuttle Limited (Biscayne Boulevard via 36th St <-> Mount. Siani Hosp)
246 Night Owl (Downtown Bus Terminal <-> Mall at 163rd Street via NW 12th and 22nd Avenues and Golden Glades Park and Ride West Lot, overnights only.)
248 Princeton Circulator (Southland Mall <-> SW 264 St./US 1) (Weekdays Only)
252 Coral Reef MAX (Dadeland South Station <-> Country Walk via SW 152nd Street & US1 Busway, limited stops)
254 Brownsville Circulator (Caleb Center <-> NW 33 Ave./46 St. or Hialeah Drive Publix  - Thursday only alternating variant - via NW 54 St.) (Weekdays Middays Only)
267 Ludlam Limited (Miami Gardens Drive/NW 186th Street & 87th Ave <-> Okeechobee Metrorail Station via W.12 Avenue) (Limited Stops)  (Weekday Peak-Hours Direction Only)
272 Sunset KAT (West Kendall Terminal <-> Dadeland North Station via SW 72nd Street, Limited Stop Route.) (Weekday Peak-Hours Only)
277 NW 7th Avenue MAX (Golden Glades Park and Ride West Lot <-> Downtown Bus Terminal/Government Center Station via NW 7th Avenue, limited stops.)(Weekdays only)
286 North Pointe Circulator (Full clockwise loop from Miami Lakes Wal-Mart/NW 177 Street-59 Avenue via NW 173rd Drive/75 Place.) (Weekdays/Saturday Only)
287 Saga Bay MAX (Goulds/South Dade Health Center and Saga Bay <-> Dadeland South Station via SW 87th Ave.) (Weekday Peak-Hours Only)
288 Kendall Cruiser (West Kendall Terminal <-> Dadeland North Station via SW 88th Street, express.) (Weekday Peak-Hours Only)
288A Kendall Cruiser (SW 127th Ave P&R <-> Dadeland North Station via SW 88th Street, express.) (Weekday Peak-Hours Only)
297 27th Ave Orange Line MAX (Miami International Airport Central Station <-> Calder Race Track/NW 207th St. via NW 27th Avenue, limited stops.)(Weekdays only)
301 Dade-Monroe Express (Florida City <-> Key Largo, Tavernier, Islamorada or Marathon Key via US-1)
302 Card Sound Express (Florida City City Hall <-> Key Largo/Ocean Reef Club via Card Sound Road (Seven Day Peak-Hours Only) = ( Only Employees Admitted to Enter The Club ) (Was numbered 300 until December 18, 2005)
338 Weekend Express (Miami International Airport Central Station <-> Dolphin Mall via SR 836, express.) (Weekends Only)
344 (MDC Homestead Campus <-> SW 193 AV & 378 ST)  (Weekdays Only)
500 Midnight Owl (Government Center Station <-> Dadeland South Station via US1/S. Dixie Hwy)(Overnights Services Only)
836 Express (Downtown Miami <-> Dolphin Station via SR 836, express.) (Weekdays Only)
837 Express (Downtown Miami <-> Tamiami Park and Ride Station via SR 836, express.) (Weekday Peak-Hours Only)

Better Bus Project Bus Routes
Below is the better bus project which was launched in 2018 by Transit Alliance and DTPW. In this section, these are the final routes prepared from Miami-Dade Transit  and approved by the Board Of County Commissioners on October 5 2021. Bus implementations are scheduled to be fully implemented in phases mid to late 2023. By visiting miamidade.gov, you would be able to view the better bus stops (bus stops that'll be either kept or removed) and to find a specific route in mind and its schedule during peak and non-peak hours. There will be certain bus routes that will be contracted out and some that are going to be brought back to city run vehicles. As with the redesign, Miami Dade Transit is retiring the use of lettered Metrobus routes in the Miami Beach area and replacing it with only numbers to coordinate with the other routes within the county.
2 (Downtown <-> El Portal via NW 2nd Ave)
3 (Aventura Mall <-> Downtown via Biscayne Blvd.)
7 (Downtown <-> Dolphin Mall via 7 St.)
7A (Downtown <-> Airport Station) (Peak Only)
8 (Brickell Station <-> SW 152 Ave/26 St via SW 8 St.) (Weekends: Brickell Station <-> FIU Maidique Campus Bus Terminal.)
9 (Aventura Mall <-> Downtown via NE 2 & NW 2 Ave.)
11 (FIU Maidique Campus Bus Terminal <-> Downtown via Flagler St.) (24 Hours)
12 (Northside Station <-> Mercy Hospital)
14 (Mt. Sinai <-> Civic Center)
15 (Omni Terminal <-> Washington Ave/Dade Blvd via Venetian Causeway.)
17 (163rd Mall <-> Golden Glades <-> Earlington Station <-> Vizcaya Station.)
20 (Airport Station <-> Miami Beach.)
21 (Calder <-> Downtown) (24 Hours)
22 (MDC North <-> Coconut Grove Station.)
24 (Brickell Station <-> FIU Maidique Campus Bus Terminal.)
24A (Brickell Station <-> Coral Gables.)
26 (Brickell Station <-> Key Biscayne via Crandon Blvd.)
27 (Coconut Grove Station <-> Calder via NW 27 Ave.) (24 Hours)
32 (Miami Gardens <-> Earlington Heights Station.)
34 Express (Dadeland South Station <-> SW 344 Street & Busway.) (Weekdays Peak-Hours Only)
35 (Florida City <-> Cutler Bay)
36A (Miami Beach <-> Airport Station)
36B (Miami Beach <-> Doral - Jackson Hospital West Campus.)
37 (Hialeah <-> South Miami station via Palm/37th Ave.)
38 Busway MAX (Dadeland South Station <-> Florida City.) (24 Hours)
39 Express (South Dade Govt Center <-> Dadeland South, express) (Weekdays Peak-Hours Only)
40 (Bird Rd/152 Ave <-> Douglas Rd Station.)
43 (Marlins Ballpark <-> Miami Intermodal Center) (Game Days Only)
47 (Airport Station <-> Hialeah Station.)
52 (Goulds <-> Dadeland South Station.)
54 (Hialeah Station <-> Biscayne Blvd via 54 St.)
56 (SW 162 Avenue <-> Nicklaus Children's Hospital <-> Airport Station via Sw 56 St, Sw 57 Ave, Nw 12th St.) (Weekdays & Saturdays Only)
62 (Hialeah <-> Biscayne Blvd  via 62 St.)
70 (Florida City <-> Cutler Bay)
72 (West Kendall Terminal <-> South Miami Station.)
73 (Okeechobee Station <-> Dadeland North via 67/72 Ave.) (Peak hours: Okeechobee Station <-> SW 152 St/Transitway.)
75 (Miami Lakes <-> Haulover.)
75A (Golden Glades <-> FIU Biscayne Bay.)
77 (Norwood <-> Downtown via NW 7 Ave.) (24 Hours)
79 (Hialeah Gardens <-> South Beach.)
79 OWL (Northside Station <-> South Beach.) (Overnight Service)
87 (Palmetto-Doral <-> Dadeland North Station via 87 Ave.)
88 (West Kendall Terminal <-> Dadeland North Station via 88 St.)
95 Golden Glades Express (Golden Glades <-> Airport/Doral via I-95 & NW 36th St) (Weekday Peak-Hours Only)
95 Golden Glades Express (Aventura Mall/Golden Glades <-> Civic Center via I-95) (Weekday Peak-Hours Only)
95 Golden Glades Express (Golden Glades <-> Civic Center via I-95) (Weekday Peak-Hours Only)
95 Golden Glades Express (Golden Glades <-> Downtown Miami via I-95) (Weekday Peak-Hours Only)
95 Golden Glades Express (Miami Gardens/Carol City/Golden Glades <-> Downtown Miami via I-95) (Weekday Peak-Hours Only)
95X Golden Glades Express (Broward Blvd Ft. Lauderdale Tri-Rail Station P&R <-> Downtown Bus Terminal via I-95) (Weekdays Peak-Hours Only)
95X Golden Glades Express (Sheridan Street Tri-Rail Station P&R <-> Downtown Bus Terminal via I-95) (Weekdays Peak-Hours Only)
95X Golden Glades Express (Broward Blvd Ft. Lauderdale Tri-Rail Station P&R. or Sheridan Street Tri-Rail Station P&R <-> Civic Center Miami via I-95 (Weekdays Peak-Hours Only )
97 (South Miami Heights <-> Perrine via Southland.)
100 (Downtown Miami <-> Aventura Mall) (24 Hours)
103 (Hialeah Gardens <-> Biscayne Blvd via 49/103 St.)
104 (MDC Kendall <-> Dadeland North Station via SW 104th St, SW 167th Ave)
104A (MDC Kendall <-> Dadeland North Station via SW 104th St, SW 96th St)
107 (Dolphin Mall <-> Cutler Bay.)
112 (MDC Kendall <-> Dadeland North Station.)
125 (MDC North <-> Surfside.)
132 Doral/Tri-Rail Shuttle (Hialeah Tri-Rail Station <-> Doral Executive Center via NW 36 St.) (Weekday Peak-Hours Only)
135 (Opa-Locka Tri-Rail <-> FIU Biscayne Bay.)
136 (The Falls <-> Douglas Road Station via SW 136th Street and Old Cutler Road.) (Weekday Peak-Hours Only)
137 West Dade Connection (FIU Maidique Campus Bus Terminal <-> South Dade Government Center.)
152 (Country Walk <-> 152 St/Transitway via SW 152nd St.) (Weekends route enters Zoo Miami hourly.)
175 NW Miami-Dade Express (I-75 & NW 186 St. Park & Ride Lot <-> Palmetto Station via I-75 and SR 826) (Weekday Peak-Hours Only)
183 (Aventura <-> Okeechobee Station.)
195 (Dade-Broward Express via Broward Blvd.) (Weekday Peak-Hours Only)
196 (Dade-Broward Express via Sheridan St.) (Weekday Peak-Hours Only)
199 (NW Dade <-> Aventura Mall.)
203 Biscayne MAX   (Downtown Miami <-> Aventura Mall Bus Terminal) (Weekdays Only)
204 Killian KAT (West Kendall Terminal <-> Hammocks Town Center <-> Dadeland North Station via SW 104 Street.) (Weekday Peak-Hours Only)
207 Little Havana Connection (Full clockwise loop from Brickell Station & Government Center Station via SW 7th Street, Beacom Boulevard, and SW 1st Street.)
208 Little Havana Connection (Full counterclockwise loop from Government Center Station & Brickell Station via Flagler Street, Beacom Boulevard, and SW 8th Street.)
211 Flagler MAX (Downtown <-> Sweetwater FIU Engineering Campus) (Weekday Peak-Hours Only)
241 Tuttle Limited (Mt. Sinai Hospital)
272 Sunset MAX (West Kendall Terminal <-> Dadeland North Station via SW 72nd Street.) (Weekday Peak-Hours Only)
279 79th Street MAX (Northside Metrorail Station <-> Miami Beach) (Weekdays Only)
287 Saga Bay MAX (South Dade Health Center <-> Dadeland South Station.) (Weekday Peak-Hours Only)
288 Kendall MAX (West Kendall Terminal <-> Dadeland North Station via SW 88th Street.) (Weekday Peak-Hours Only)
288A Kendall MAX (SW 127th Ave P&R <-> Dadeland North Station via SW 88th Street.) (Weekday Peak-Hours Only)
295 (I-95 Ft Lauderdale <-> Civic Center Express.) (Weekday Peak-Hours Only)
296 (I-95 Sheridan <-> Civic Center Express.) (Weekday Peak-Hours Only)
301 Dade-Monroe Express (Florida City <-> Key Largo, Tavernier, Islamorada or Marathon via US-1)
302 Card Sound Express (Florida City <-> Key Largo/Ocean Reef Club via Card Sound Road.) (Only Employees Admitted to Enter The Club) (Weekdays/Weekends peak hours every 95mins)
338 Weekend Express (MIA Station <-> Dolphin Mall via SR 836.) (Weekends Only)
344 (MDC Homestead <-> Florida City.) (Weekdays & Saturdays Only)
400 South OWL (Government Center Station <-> Dadeland South Station via US1/S. Dixie Hwy.) (Overnight Service)
401 North OWL (Downtown Bus Terminal <-> Mall at 163rd Street via NW 12th and 22nd Avenues and Golden Glades P&R.)         (Overnight Service)
500 Cutler Bay Circulator (Cutler Bay Town Hall - Southland Mall - SW 112 Ave (Target) - South Dade Government Center.)
510 Skylake Circulator (Skylake)
210 Skylake Circulator (FIU Maidique Campus Metrobus terminal <-> SW 8 St & 69 Ave) (Weekdays & Saturdays only)
836 Express (Dolphin Station P&R <-> Downtown Miami.) (Weekdays Only)
837 Express (Tamiami Station P&R <-> Downtown Miami.) (Weekday Peak-Hours Only)

Former Routes
6 (Coconut Grove Station <-> NW 29th Street/18th Avenue) (Discontinued on August 27, 2017)
28 Mall at 163rd St. <-> FIU Biscayne Bay Campus via NW/NE 167th St.) (Merged with part of route E to form route 135 on December 13, 2009)
41 (Dolphin Mall <-> Doral Center) (Merged into route 36 on June 14, 2009)
48 (Brickell Station <-> University Station via South Bayshore Dr.) (Weekdays Only) (Discontinued on August 27, 2017)
49 (NW 167th St./57th Ave. <-> Golden Glades Park and Ride Lot via NW 183 Street. Was route 95 Express Carol City branch before December 13, 2009, weekday rush hour peak direction service only.) (Discontinued on November 27, 2011)
52A (South Miami Station <-> Dadeland North MetroRail Station) (Weekday Peak-Hours Only)(Discontinued on November 27, 2011)
56 (Miami Children's Hospital <-> MDC Kendall campus via Miller Dr & 117 Ave) (Weekdays Only) (Discontinued on June 23, 2013; route 56A renumbered new route 56)
59 (Aventura Mall <-> Golden Glades Park and Ride Lot via I-95. Weekday rush hour peak direction service only, was route 95 Express Aventura Mall branch before December 13, 2009.) (Discontinued on November 28, 2010)                                  
62A (Hialeah/Palm Ave-W 3 St <-> Omni Terminal (Was later Changed to Biscayne Bvld/62 St)                      
62B (Hialeah/Palm Avenue-West 3rd St. or Dr. Martin Luther King Jr. Plaza Station <-> Miami Beach/41st Street-Indian Creek Drive via NW/NE 62nd Street and Julia Tuttle Causeway) (Weekday Peak-Hours Only)
65 (Douglas Road Station <-> Dadeland South Station via Old Cutler Road) (Merged into route 136 on December 13, 2009)
68 Gratigny Connection (Hialeah Gardens <-> MDC North Campus) (Discontinued on June 15, 2008)
70 (Saga Bay (Sunday Only) or Southland Mall <-> SW 344 St P&R Lot) (Merged with route 35 on March 11, 2018)
83 (Miami Lakes Dr./NW 60th Ave. <-> FIU Biscayne Bay Campus via NW 183rd St.) (Merged with route 183 Express to form route 183 local on December 13, 2009)
91 (NW 87th Ave./186th St <-> The Mall at 163rd Street via NW 199th/215th Sts.) (Merged into route 99 on December 13, 2009)                                                                                                                                                98 (Discontinued in A Unknown Date)
97 27th Avenue MAX (Dr. Martin Luther King, Jr. Plaza Station <-> Calder Race Track/NW 207th St. via NW 27th Avenue, limited stops.) (Replaced by route 297 on July 22, 2012)
K (111) (Omni Station <-> Haulover Beach or Diplomat Mall) (Part merged with route R to form route 115/117 on December 13, 2009; part replaced by revised route 120 (formerly T); rest redundant with route E (105) and Broward County Transit Route 28)
117 Mid-North Beach Connection  (Counterclockwise Service) (Lincoln Rd Mall <-> 88th St.) (Merged with route 115 on August 27, 2017; 115 operated clockwise, and 117 operated counterclockwise)
R (118) (Lincoln Road <-> Hawthorne Ave./85th Street via Alton Rd.) (Merged with part of route K to form route 115/117 on December 13, 2009)(24 Hours)
V (122) (Golden Glades Park & Ride <-> Diplomat Mall) (Discontinued on June 15, 2008)
123 South Beach Local (South Pointe Drive <-> Belle Isle) (Was route W (123) before June 15, 2008; discontinued on November 19, 2017 and replaced by the enhanced South Beach Loop Trolley)
128 Howard Killian Connection (Demonstration route only running from December 18, 2005 to July 16, 2006)
133 Airport/Tri-Rail Shuttle (Hialeah Market Station or Tri-Rail Metrorail Station <-> Miami International Airport via NW 36 St. & 42nd Ave/Lejune Rd.) (Discontinued when the Tri-Rail extension to the airport opened on April 19, 2015)
134 Riverside Shuttle (Discontinued in 2003)
147 (Kendall-Tamiami Executive Airport <-> Dolphin Mall) (Discontinued on June 15, 2008)
152 Gables Connection (South Miami Station <-> Miami Children's Hospital) (Discontinued on May 20, 2007)
175A Northwest Dade Express (Palmetto Station <-> Pembroke Lakes Mall via I-75) (Discontinued on May 20, 2007)
183 183rd Street MAX (NW 186 St/87th Ave. <-> Aventura Mall via NW/NE 183rd Street, limited stops) (Merged with route 83 to form route 183 local on December 13, 2009)
200A (Southland Mall <-> Americana Village via 200 St.) (Discontinued on December 18, 2005 due to low ridership)
201 (Discontinued in 2001)
216 Goulds Connection (Southland Mall <-> 200/208 St. at 117th/122nd Ave.) (Discontinued on June 15, 2008)
224 Coral Way MAX (Douglas Road Station <-> SW 152nd Avenue via Coral Way, limited stops.) (Merged into route 24 on December 13, 2009)
231 (Discontinued in 2001)
236 Airport Owl (Loop through downtown Miami and Miami International Airport) (Discontinued on October 21, 2007; partially replaced by route J (110) extension)
237 Douglas Bridge (Discontinued on July 18, 2004) 
240 Bird Road MAX (SW 152 Avenue <-> Dadeland North Station via SW 40 Street, limited stops.) (Merged into route 40 on December 13, 2009)
241 North Dade Connection (Miami Lakes Educational Center <-> Sierra Dr at 2 Ct) (Discontinued on June 15, 2008)
242 Doral Connection (Palmetto Station <-> Dolphin Mall) (Discontinued on June 15, 2008)
243 Seaport Connection (Historic Overtown/Lyric Theater Station <-> Port of Miami) (Discontinued on August 17, 2014 due to low ridership; City of Miami operates the Coral Way Trolley route)
244 Bird Shuttle (merged with route 42 on March 16, 2003)
245 Okeechobee Connection (Palmetto Station <-> Grand Park Industrial Park) (Discontinued on June 15, 2008)
247 Mall Shuttle (Merged with route 7 in 2002)
248 Brickell Key Shuttle (Brickell Station <-> Brickell Key/Mandarin Oriental Hotel.) (Discontinued on July 22, 2012, as Miami introduced the Miami Trolley Brickell/Biscayne route in spring 2012)
249 Coconut Grove Circulator (Douglas Road Station <-> Coconut Grove Station) (Discontinued on January 2, 2018)
252A (Dadeland South Station <-> SW 162nd Avenue via SW 152nd Street, Coral Reef MAX variant, limited stops) (Weekday Peak-Hours/Weekends Only)(Discontinued on August 27, 2017)
267X Ludlam MAX (Okeechobee Station <-> NW 67th Ave./186 St. via W 12th/NW 67th Avenues. NOTE: Name was shortened to '267 MAX' when it was extended to Pembroke Lakes Mall and wasn't restored when it was truncated.) (Merged into route 73 on December 13, 2009)
278 Flagami Connection (Mall of the Americas <-> Tamiami Canal Ave./62 Ave.) (Discontinued on June 15, 2008)
282 Hialeah Gardens Connection (NW 87th Ave./186th St. <-> Palmetto Station via NW 82 Ave.) (Merged into route 54 on December 13, 2009)
300 Northeast Dade Connection (Discontinued on July 1, 2002)

See also
List of Miami-Dade Transit metro stations
Track buses throughout Miami-Dade County
Better Bus Project website

References

External links
 Miami-Dade Transit website

Miami Metrobus
Miami Metrobus routes
Transportation in Miami
Miami Metrobus